Saddleback Butte State Park is a state park in the Antelope Valley of the western Mojave Desert, in Southern California. It is located east of Lancaster, north of the community of Lake Los Angeles, and south of Edwards in the unincorporated community of Hi Vista.

See also
Natural history of the Mojave Desert
List of California state parks
Protected areas of the Mojave Desert

Further reading

External links 
California State Parks: official Saddleback Butte State Park website

State parks of California
Antelope Valley
Buttes of California
Geography of Palmdale, California
Landforms of Los Angeles County, California
Parks in Los Angeles County, California
Protected areas of the Mojave Desert
Protected areas established in 1960